"There's a Fool Born Every Minute" is a song written by Paul Evans and Paul Parnes. It was recorded and released as a single in 1968 by American country artist, Skeeter Davis.

"There's a Fool Born Every Minute" was recorded at the RCA Victor Studio in Nashville, Tennessee, United States on January 11, 1968. The session was produced by Felton Jarvis. The song was released as a single in March 1968, reaching the top-twenty of the Billboard Magazine Hot Country Singles chart. Additionally, it became Davis' first single to chart on the Canadian RPM Country Songs chart, reaching number eighteen. In 1971, the song was issued onto her studio album Skeeter Skeeter Skeeter.

Chart performance

References 

1968 songs
Skeeter Davis songs
Song recordings produced by Felton Jarvis
1968 singles
RCA Victor singles